Isaiah Green may refer to:

Isaiah L. Green (1761–1841), U.S. Representative from Massachusetts
Isaiah Green (American football) (born 1989), American football cornerback